Kelvin L. Davis (born c.1965) is an American businessman.  A Stanford University and Harvard Business School graduate, he is a senior partner and Head of the North American Buyouts Group of the  Texas Pacific Group, based in Fort Worth, Texas. He is a Member of the Board on numerous bodies and is an executive director at Metro-Goldwyn-Mayer film studios.

References

American business executives
Metro-Goldwyn-Mayer executives
Living people
Harvard Business School alumni
Stanford University alumni
20th-century American businesspeople
Year of birth missing (living people)